Paul Lawrence Modrich (born June 13, 1946) is an American biochemist, James B. Duke Professor of Biochemistry at Duke University and Investigator at the Howard Hughes Medical Institute. He is known for his research on DNA mismatch repair. Modrich received the Nobel Prize in Chemistry 2015, jointly with Aziz Sancar and Tomas Lindahl.

Early life and education

Modrich was born on June 13, 1946, in Raton, New Mexico to Laurence Modrich and Margaret McTurk. He has a younger brother Dave. His father was a biology teacher and coach for basketball, football and tennis at Raton High School where he graduated in 1964. Modrich is of Croatian, Montenegrin, German and Scottish (Gaelic) origin. His paternal grandfather, of Croatian descent, is probably from the small village of Modrići near Zadar, and grandmother of Montenegrin descent, both immigrated to the United States from coastal Croatia in the late 19th century. His maternal family is of mixed German and Scotch-Irish descent. Modrich married fellow scientist Vickers Burdett in 1980.

Modrich obtained a B.S. degree from the Massachusetts Institute of Technology in 1968 and subsequently a Ph.D. degree from Stanford University in 1973. He continued his research as a postdoc in the lab of Charles C. Richardson at Harvard Medical School for a year (1973–1974).

Research
Modrich became an assistant professor at the chemistry department of University of California, Berkeley in 1974. He joined Duke University's faculty in 1976 and has been a Howard Hughes Investigator since 1995. He works primarily on strand-directed mismatch repair. His lab demonstrated how DNA mismatch repair serves as a copyeditor to prevent errors from DNA polymerase. Matthew Meselson previously proposed the existence of recognition of mismatches. Modrich performed biochemical experiments to study mismatch repair in E. coli. They later searched for proteins associated with mismatch repair in humans.

Honors and awards 
Honors and awards received by Modrich include:

1983: Pfizer Award in Enzyme Chemistry
1996: General Motors Charles S. Mott Prize in Cancer Research
1998: Robert J. and Claire Pasarow Foundation Medical Research Award for cancer research
2000 Feodor Lynen Medal
2005: American Cancer Society Medal of Honor
2015: Nobel Prize in Chemistry
2016: Arthur Kornberg and Paul Berg Lifetime Achievement Award in Biomedical Sciences

Modrich is a fellow of the American Academy of Arts and Sciences and a member of the National Academy of Medicine and the National Academy of Sciences.

References

External links 
 

1946 births
Nobel laureates in Chemistry
Duke University faculty
American people of Croatian descent
American people of Montenegrin descent
American people of German descent
American people of Scotch-Irish descent
Stanford University alumni
American Nobel laureates
American biochemists
Howard Hughes Medical Investigators
Living people
Members of the United States National Academy of Sciences
Fellows of the American Academy of Arts and Sciences
People from Raton, New Mexico
Articles containing video clips
Members of the National Academy of Medicine